Lou Jiahui (born 26 May 1991) is a Chinese footballer. She plays as a midfielder for Henan Jianye in the CWSL.

Career
The 2008 Summer Olympics held in Beijing was the first major tournament that Lou played at. At the time, she did not have any experience in the Under-20 team and was the youngest player in the squad. She made her first appearance in the opening match, coming on as an 83rd-minute substitute for goalscorer Han Duan in the 2–1 win over Sweden.

International goals

See also
 List of women's footballers with 100 or more caps

References

External links
 
 
 

1991 births
Living people
Chinese women's footballers
China women's international footballers
Footballers at the 2008 Summer Olympics
Olympic footballers of China
2015 FIFA Women's World Cup players
Women's association football midfielders
Footballers at the 2018 Asian Games
Asian Games silver medalists for China
Asian Games medalists in football
Medalists at the 2018 Asian Games
2019 FIFA Women's World Cup players
FIFA Century Club